The Tender Hearted Boy is a 1913 American silent black and white drama film directed by D.W. Griffith, written by Lionel Barrymore and starring Robert Harron, Kate Bruce and Mae Marsh.

Cast
 Robert Harron as The Tender-Hearted Boy
 Kate Bruce as The Tender-Hearted Boy's mother
 Mae Marsh as The Tender-Hearted Boy's Sweetheart
 W. Chrystie Miller as The Sweetheart's Father
 John T. Dillon as The Butcher
 Gertrude Norman as The Miser
 Lionel Barrymore as Undetermined Secondary Role
 Clara T. Bracy as Old Woman
 Walter P. Lewis as Rent Collector
 Alfred Paget as Policeman
 W.C. Robinson as Man on Street
 J. Waltham as Policeman

References

External links
 

American silent films
American black-and-white films
Silent American drama films
1913 drama films
1913 films
Films directed by D. W. Griffith
Films with screenplays by Lionel Barrymore
Films shot in New York City
Biograph Company films
General Film Company
1910s American films